The 1996 NFL season was the 77th regular season of the National Football League (NFL) and the season was marked by notable controversies from beginning to end. Most significantly, the Cleveland Browns relocation controversy resulted in a then-unique legal settlement where the Cleveland Browns franchise, history, records, and intellectual property remained in Cleveland (with the Browns officially deactivated), while its players and personnel transferred to Baltimore, technically to a new league franchise that was named the Baltimore Ravens.

The season ended with Super Bowl XXXI when the Green Bay Packers defeated the New England Patriots 35–21 at the Louisiana Superdome.

Player movement

Transactions

Retirements
January 9, 1996: Rams offensive lineman Jackie Slater announced his retirement.

Draft
The 1996 NFL Draft was held from April 20 to 21, 1996 at New York City's Paramount Theater. With the first pick, the New York Jets selected wide receiver Keyshawn Johnson from the University of Southern California.

Referee changes
Gordon McCarter retired during the 1996 off-season. He joined the NFL in 1967, serving as a line judge and back judge, before being promoted to referee in 1974. Dale Hamer, who had to sit out the 1995 season to recover from open heart surgery, took over McCarter's officiating crew.

Future Vice President of Officiating Mike Pereira was hired as a side judge. He left the field after two seasons to join the league office and succeeded Jerry Seeman in 2001.

Major rule changes
In order to reduce injuries, hits with the helmet or to the head will be personal fouls and subject to fines.

Preseason

American Bowl
A series of National Football League pre-season exhibition games that were held at sites outside the United States. Two games were contested in 1996.

Hall of Fame Game
The Pro Football Hall of Fame Game, in which the Indianapolis Colts defeated the New Orleans Saints 10–3, was played on July 27, and held at Fawcett Stadium in Canton, Ohio, the same city where the league was founded. The 1996 Hall of Fame Class included Lou Creekmur, Dan Dierdorf, a former offensive lineman with the St. Louis Cardinals and a member of the Monday Night Football broadcast team, Joe Gibbs, a three-time Super Bowl winning coach with Washington, Charlie Joiner and Mel Renfro.

Regular season

Scheduling formula

Highlights of the 1996 season included:
Thanksgiving: Two games were played on Thursday, November 28, featuring Kansas City at Detroit and Washington at Dallas, with Kansas City and Dallas winning.

Final standings

Tiebreakers
Jacksonville was the second AFC Wild Card ahead of Indianapolis and Kansas City based on better conference record (7–5 to Colts’ 6–6 and Chiefs’ 5–7).
Indianapolis was the third AFC Wild Card based on head-to-head victory over Kansas City (1–0).
Cincinnati finished ahead of Houston in the AFC Central based on better net division points (19 to Oilers’ 11).
Oakland finished ahead of Seattle in the AFC West based on better division record (3–5 to Seahawks’ 2–6).
Dallas finished ahead of Philadelphia in the NFC East based on better record against common opponents (7–4 to Eagles' 6–5.)
Minnesota was the third NFC Wild Card based on better conference record than Washington (8–4 to Redskins' 6–6).
Carolina finished ahead of San Francisco in the NFC West based on head-to-head sweep (2–0).
Atlanta finished ahead of New Orleans in the NFC West based on head-to-head sweep (2–0).

Playoffs

Notable events

When Art Modell, owner of the Cleveland Browns, wanted to relocate his team to Baltimore in a surprise move first reported by The Boston Globe on November 4, 1995, the ensuing press furor and public relations mess forced the league to intercede and make an agreement with him and the cities of Cleveland and Baltimore before the new season began. In the agreement, the name, colors and history of the Browns were to remain in Cleveland, while the relocated club would technically be a new league franchise; the Browns would return to play in Cleveland at a new stadium no later than 1999 by way of an expansion or another franchise relocation. Either way, the Cleveland Browns would continue, officially suspended for the 1996 through 1998 seasons, while the Baltimore Ravens' history begins with the 1996 season.

The season was also the final season for the Houston Oilers before leaving Texas for Memphis for the following season, and then to Nashville in 1998.  This move left Houston with no professional football team until the 2002 debut of the Texans.

One of the most memorable aspects of the 1996 season was that the Carolina Panthers and Jacksonville Jaguars, each in just their second year of existence, both advanced to their respective conference championship games. 1996 marked the third year the NFL salary cap was in force and also marked the end of multiple “dynasties” in the NFL as it was the first season since 1991 (and only the second since 1987) in which neither the Dallas Cowboys nor the San Francisco 49ers played in the NFC Championship Game. It was also the first NFC Championship Game ever that did not feature either the Cowboys, 49ers, Washington Redskins, or Los Angeles Rams.

The season ended with Super Bowl XXXI when the Green Bay Packers defeated the New England Patriots in a game ultimately decided when a third-quarter kick-off was returned 99 yards for a touchdown by Packers’ kick returner, Desmond Howard. For that, and his excellent performance on kick-off and punt returns throughout the game, Howard was named Super Bowl MVP, the first and only time that a special teams player has earned that award.

All that was nearly overshadowed by the press feeding frenzy reporting and commenting on the rumor, between the AFC championship game up to and into the broadcast coverage of Super Bowl XXXI itself, that iconic coach Bill Parcells was planning on breaking his contract with the New England Patriots because he did not get along well with owner Robert Kraft, who had helped turn around New England's image after years of ownership that was either dismal or absent. In the event, Parcells did not even return with the players, and telephone records showed he was talking to the Jets in the days before and the day of the Super Bowl itself. This documentary evidence led to the league awarding the Patriots multiple draft picks in compensation for the "tampering" by the Jets, which is but a continuation of one-upmanship that has gone on for years between the heated rivals.

Statistical leaders

Team

Individual

Awards

Coaching changes

Arizona Cardinals – Vince Tobin new head coach. Replaced Buddy Ryan, who was fired after the 1995 season.
Tampa Bay Buccaneers – Tony Dungy new head coach. Replaced Sam Wyche who was fired after the 1995 season.
Miami Dolphins – Jimmy Johnson new head coach. Replaced Don Shula who retired after the 1995 season.
Indianapolis Colts – Lindy Infante new head coach. Replaced Ted Marchibroda who was offered a job from the Baltimore Ravens.
Cincinnati Bengals – Dave Shula was fired by mid season and was replaced by interim head coach Bruce Coslet.
New Orleans Saints – Jim Mora resigned at mid season and was replaced by interim head coach Rick Venturi.
Baltimore Ravens – Ted Marchibroda new head coach. Replaced Bill Belichick, who was fired in February 1996 shortly after the franchise was officially formed following the Cleveland Browns relocation controversy.

Stadium changes
 Baltimore Ravens: The new Ravens team moved into Baltimore's Memorial Stadium
 Carolina Panthers: The Panthers moved from Memorial Stadium in Clemson, South Carolina to Ericsson Stadium in Charlotte, North Carolina, with the telecommunications company Ericsson acquiring the naming rights
 Cincinnati Bengals: Riverfront Stadium was renamed Cinergy Field after the energy company Cinergy acquires the naming rights
 Miami Dolphins: Joe Robbie Stadium was renamed Pro Player Stadium after Pro Player, the sports apparel division of Fruit of the Loom, acquired the naming rights
 Tampa Bay Buccaneers: Tampa Stadium was renamed Houlihan's Stadium after the Houlihan's restaurant chain acquired the naming rights

Uniform changes
 The Arizona Cardinals modified their white jerseys, removing the black trim from numbers, removing the Cardinals logo from the sleeves, and moving the Arizona state flag above the sleeve stripes to where the logo was. The striping on the white jerseys and socks worn with those jerseys changed to a wide red stripe surrounded by narrow copper and blue stripes to match the colors of the state flag. 
 The inaugural Baltimore Ravens uniforms featured purple jerseys with white numbers trimmed in black and gold at home, and white jerseys with purple numbers trimmed in black and white on the road. Black pants worn with both jerseys. The team's original logo featured raven wings outspread from a shield displaying a letter "B".
 The Dallas Cowboys introduced new blue jerseys with white lettering and numbers, and placed their star logo upon the sleeve stripes.
 The Minnesota Vikings added their Norseman logo to the jersey sleeves. This moved the TV numbers from the sleeves to the shoulders. 
 The New Orleans Saints switched to gold numbers on both their black and white jerseys, similar to their original 1960s design. The secondary logo on the jersey sleeves, that featured and outline of the state of Louisiana, was replaced with another fleur-de-lis.
 The Philadelphia Eagles introduced new uniforms, changing their primary color from kelly green to a darker shade described as "midnight green". The gray pants were replaced by white pants with the green jerseys, and green pants with the white jerseys. A new logo featuring a white eagle head with silver and black accents was placed on the green jersey sleeves, and the eagle wings on the helmets were redesigned to match.  
 The San Francisco 49ers introduced new uniforms featuring a darker shade of red, a black dropshadow effect added to the numbers, and switching from gold to white pants.

Television
This was the third year under the league's four-year broadcast contracts with ABC, Fox, NBC, TNT, and ESPN. ABC, Fox, and NBC continued to televise Monday Night Football, the NFC package, the AFC package, respectively. Sunday night games aired on TNT during the first half of the season, and ESPN during the second half of the season.

With Jimmy Johnson leaving Fox NFL Sunday to become the head coach of the Miami Dolphins, Ronnie Lott was brought in to replace him.

Cris Collinsworth replaced Joe Montana as one of the analysts on The NFL on NBC pregame show, alongside Greg Gumbel, Mike Ditka, and Joe Gibbs.

External links
Football Outsiders DVOA Ratings and Commentary

References
NFL Record and Fact Book
NFL History 1991–2000 (Last accessed October 17, 2005)
Total Football: The Official Encyclopedia of the National Football League
Steelers Fever – History of NFL Rules (Last accessed October 17, 2005)

Footnotes

National Football League seasons
 
National Football League